Abū Ḥajal Muslim ibn ʿAwsaja al-Asadī was a companion of Islamic Prophet Muhammad. He assisted Muslim ibn Aqil in Kufa. Then he joined Husayn ibn Ali army with his family. He was killed in battle of Karbala.

Name and lineage 
He is Muslim son of Awsaja son of Sa'd son of Tha'laba son of Dudan son of Asad son of Khuzayma al-Asadi. His Kunya is Abu Hajal. He was a companion of Husayn ibn Ali. Muslim ibn Awsaja and Habib ibn Muzahir both were from the tribe of Banu Asad.

In Kufa 
Muslim ibn Awsaja supported Husayn ibn Ali's ambassador, Muslim ibn Aqil, in Kufa with weaponry and tried to take oath of allegiance for Husayn ibn Ali. 
The spy of Ubayd Allah ibn Ziyad, Ma'qil, found the safe house of Muslim ibn Aqeel through Muslim ibn Awsaja. Consequently, Hani ibn Urwa who sheltered Muslim ibn Aqil in his house was arrested. Then Muslim ibn Aqil to organizing an army chose Muslim ibn Awsaja as commander of Banu Asad and Madh'hij and some other commanders. Soon after Hani ibn Urwa and Muslim ibn Aqil were killed by Ubayd Allah ibn Ziyad, and Muslim ibn Awsaja hided in a safe house for a while. Afterward he joined Husayn ibn Ali army with his family in Karbala.

In Karbala

The Night before Ashura 
At Tasu'a night, Husayn ibn Ali told his soldiers:

Then, some companions proclaimed their allegiance and loyalty to Husayn ibn Ali over again. After the descendants of Banu Hashim, Mulim ibn Awsaja was the first one who said:

His motto in the battle of Karbala 
He repeatedly expressed this motto in the battle of Karbala:

Asad means lion.

Death 
Muslim ibn Awsaja was the first one who was killed in the battle of Karbala before Amr ibn Qartah.  He was about 70 years old.

See also 
 List of casualties in Husayn's army at the Battle of Karbala
 Ashura
 Tasu'a
 Burayr ibn Khudayr al-Hamdani

References 

Sahabah killed in battle
People killed at the Battle of Karbala
Husayn ibn Ali
Hussainiya
680 deaths